Philip Allen (September 1, 1785December 16, 1865) was an American manufacturer and politician from Rhode Island. He served as Governor of Rhode Island and as a Democratic member of the United States Senate.

Early life

Allen was born in Providence, Rhode Island, the son of Zachariah Allen and Nancy Crawford Allen. He was educated by private tutors and attended Taunton Academy and Robert Rogers School in Newport, Rhode Island. In 1803, he graduated from the College of Rhode Island and Providence Plantations (the former name of Brown University) at Providence. After graduation, he engaged in mercantile pursuits and foreign commerce before becoming a manufacturer of cotton goods in Smithfield, Rhode Island. He was president of the Providence Insurance Company, and in 1831 he began manufacturing cotton goods in Providence.

Political career
He began his political career as a member of the Rhode Island House of Representatives, serving from 1819 to 1821. In 1827, he was appointed pension agent and president of the Rhode Island branch of the United States Bank.

Allen was elected as the Democratic Governor of Rhode Island in 1851. He served as Governor until 1853, when he resigned that office after being elected to represent Rhode Island in the United States Senate. Allen served in the Senate from July 20, 1853 to March 3, 1859, and was Chairman for the Committee of Agriculture, Nutrition and Forestry during the Thirty-third Congress and the Thirty-fourth Congress. He was not a candidate for renomination, and retired from politics and business in 1859.

He died in Providence on December 16, 1865, and is interred in the North Burial Ground in Providence.

Family life
He married Phoebe Aborn in 1815, and they had eleven children.

Honors
In 2016, Allen was inducted into the Rhode Island Heritage Hall of Fame.

References

External links
 
 
 National Governors Association

|-

1785 births
1865 deaths
Politicians from Providence, Rhode Island
American people of English descent
Democratic Party United States senators from Rhode Island
Democratic Party governors of Rhode Island
Democratic Party members of the Rhode Island House of Representatives
19th-century American politicians
Brown University alumni
Burials at North Burying Ground (Providence)